USS LST-4 was an  of the United States Navy built during World War II. She was transferred to the Royal Navy in December 1944. Like many of her class, she was not named and is properly referred to by her hull designation.

Construction 
LST-4 was laid down on 4 July 1942, at Pittsburgh, Pennsylvania by the Dravo Corporation; launched on 9 October 1942; sponsored by Mrs. J. Bartolo; and commissioned on 14 February 1943.

USN service history
LST-4 was assigned to the Mediterranean Theatre and participated in the following operations: the Allied invasion of Sicily in July 1943; the Salerno Landings in September 1943; the Anzio-Nettuno advanced landings on the west coast of Italy from January to February 1944; and the Invasion of southern France from August to September 1944.

Royal Navy service
LST-4 was decommissioned from the USN on 23 December 1944, in Bizerte, Tunisia, and commissioned into the Royal Navy the next day. On 14 January 1945, while on sailing between Taranto, Italy, and Piraeus, Greece, she struck a mine, but was still able to make Piraeus. She transferred to Alexandria, Egypt, in June, before making way for Malta, for repairs from 10 to 24 October 1945.

She was returned to the United States in early 1946, by a Royal Navy crew. En route she lost her port side screw and had to be towed by another LST to Norfolk, Virginia. She was turned back over to USN custody.

Final disposition
LST-4 was struck from the Navy list on 19 June 1946. On 10 September 1947, she was sold to the Boston Metals Company, of Baltimore, Maryland, for scrap.

Awards
LST-4 earned four battle stars for World War II service.

References

Bibliography

External links

 

 

LST-1-class tank landing ships of the United States Navy
Ships built in Pittsburgh
1942 ships
World War II amphibious warfare vessels of the United States
LST-1-class tank landing ships of the Royal Navy
World War II amphibious warfare vessels of the United Kingdom
Ships built by Dravo Corporation